Juncker is a surname. Notable people with the surname include:

Juncker (singer), full name Christian Juncker, Danish singer and songwriter
Henry Damian Juncker (1809–1868), French-born Roman Catholic prelate and first Bishop of Alton, Illinois
Jean-Claude Juncker, Prime Minister of Luxembourg (1995–2013) and President of the European Commission (2014 –2019)

See also
Junker
Junkers
Jucker (surname)

Surnames from nicknames